Lord Sempill (also variously rendered as Semple or Semphill) is a title in the Peerage of Scotland. It was created in circa 1489 for Sir John Sempill, founder of the collegiate Church of Lochwinnoch. Sempill was killed at the Battle of Flodden in 1513. His grandson, the third Lord, was known as "The Great Lord Sempill". His grandson, the fourth Lord, was Ambassador from King James VI of Scotland to Spain in 1596. The male line failed on the death of his great-grandson, the eighth Lord, in 1684. He was succeeded by his sister Anne, wife of Robert Abercromby, who in 1685 was created Lord Glassford for life. In 1688 she obtained a new charter settling the lordship of Sempill in default of male issue, upon her daughters without division by her then and any future husband. Her younger son, the twelfth Lord, commanded the left wing of the government army at the Battle of Culloden in 1746.

His great-grandson, the fifteenth Lord, died unmarried in 1835 and was succeeded by his younger sister Maria. She was the wife of Edward Chandler. In 1853 they were both allowed by Royal licence to assume the name and arms of Sempill only. However, they had no children and Maria was succeeded by her first cousin once removed Sir William Forbes, 8th Baronet, of Craigievar, who became the seventeenth Lord Sempill (see Forbes baronets of Craigievar for earlier history of this title). He was the grandson of the Hon. Sarah Sempill, eldest daughter of the thirteenth Lord Sempill. In 1885 he assumed by Royal licence the additional and principal surname of Sempill. His son, the eighteenth Lord, sat in the House of Lords as a Scottish Representative Peer from 1910 to 1934. His son, the nineteenth Lord, is known as an aviation pioneer who sold state secrets to the Japanese prior to World War Two and was also a Scottish Representative Peer between 1935 and 1963 (when all Scottish peers gained an automatic seat in the House of Lords). He fathered one daughter.

On the nineteenth Lord's death in 1965, the baronetcy and barony were separated: the lordship passed to his daughter Ann, the twentieth Lady Sempill, but the baronetcy could only be inherited by male heirs. After a two-year legal dispute to determine if he was a legitimate male successor, the nineteenth Lord's younger sibling, a trans man who had changed his legal gender from female to male in 1952, succeeded in the baronetcy as Sir Ewan Forbes, 11th Baronet. On Sir Ewan's death in 1991 the baronetcy was then inherited by the same person who had challenged the succession, his cousin Sir John Alexander Cumnock Forbes, 12th Baronet. (For information about the further succession of the baronetcy, see Forbes baronets of Craigievar.)

The twentieth Lady Sempill had married and divorced Eric Holt; she later married secondly Stuart Whitemore Chant, who in 1966 by decree of the Lord Lyon assumed the additional surname of Sempill.  the title is held by Lady Sempill's eldest son from her second marriage, the twenty-first Lord, who succeeded in 1995.

In 1712, the exiled James Francis Edward Stuart recognised Robert Sempill, a descendent of the fifth Lord, as the legitimate holder of the title and made him Lord Sempill of Dykehead in the Jacobite peerage. This claim and title were never recognised by the British authorities.

Lords Sempill (c. 1489)
John Sempill, 1st Lord Sempill (d. 1513)
William Sempill, 2nd Lord Sempill (d. 1552)
Robert Sempill, 3rd Lord Sempill (c. 1505–1576)
Robert Sempill, 4th Lord Sempill (d. 1611)
Hugh Sempill, 5th Lord Sempill (d. 1639)
Francis Sempill, 6th Lord Sempill (c. 1622–1644)
Robert Sempill, 7th Lord Sempill (d. 1675)
Francis Sempill, 8th Lord Sempill (c. 1660–1684)
Anne Abercromby, 9th Lady Sempill (d. 1695)
Francis Sempill, 10th Lord Sempill (c. 1685–1716)
John Sempill, 11th Lord Sempill (d. 1727)
Hugh Sempill, 12th Lord Sempill (1688–1746)
John Sempill, 13th Lord Sempill (d. 1782)
Hugh Sempill, 14th Lord Sempill (1758–1830)
Selkirk Sempill, 15th Lord Sempill (1788–1835)
Maria Janet Sempill, 16th Lady Sempill (1790–1884)
William Forbes-Sempill, 17th Lord Sempill (1836–1905)
John Forbes-Sempill, 18th Lord Sempill (1863–1934)
William Francis Forbes-Sempill, 19th Lord Sempill (1893–1965)
Ann Moira Forbes-Sempill, 20th Lady Sempill (1920–1995)
James William Stuart Whitemore Sempill, 21st Lord Sempill (b. 1949)

The heir apparent is the present holder's son Hon. Francis Henry William Sempill, Master of Sempill (b. 1979)
The heir apparent’s heir apparent is his son, Felix Hew Forbes Sempill (b. 2012)

See also
Forbes baronets, of Craigievar

Notes

References
Kidd, Charles, Williamson, David (editors). Debrett's Peerage and Baronetage (1990 edition). New York: St Martin's Press, 1990.

Sempill
1489 establishments in Scotland
Sempill